The 2018 Three Days of De Panne (Dutch: Driedaagse De Panne–Koksijde) was the 42nd edition of the Three Days of De Panne cycle race. The race took place on 21 March 2018, between Bruges and De Panne. It was part of the 2018 UCI Europe Tour calendar in category 1.HC. The race was won by Elia Viviani.

General classification

References

Three Days of Bruges–De Panne
Three Days of Bruges–De Panne
Three Days of Bruges–De Panne